KHTQ is an active rock outlet licensed to Hayden, Idaho and serving the Spokane, Washington area. They broadcast at 94.5 MHz on the FM dial with an effective radiated power of 83 kW and is owned by Morgan Murphy Media.

History
KHTQ, whose moniker is "Rock 94", has been offering a current-based mix of today's cutting-edge rock. modern rock and heavy metal hits since their flip from adult top 40 in 1998. As a top 40 station, KHTQ had a very adult lean, as Spokane did not have any hot AC stations at the time. KHTQ competed with very successful "93 Zoo FM", which would later become owned by the same company. At that time, Zoo FM played a pop/rhythmic hybrid presentation, which gave KHTQ the station for adult audiences. After changing formats, "Rock 94" originally aired a rock/alternative hybrid, which was common among rock stations at the time. While playing bands such as Korn, Limp Bizkit, Sevendust, Slipknot and other new metal acts. They occasionally played acts like AC/DC and Ozzy Osbourne, but mostly classic metal to distance themselves from 105.7 the Peak, which also mixed in harder alternative music.

It is also Spokane's affiliate of the Seattle Seahawks radio network.

Notable Air-Talent has included: GA (Gary Allen), The Stunt Double JP a.k.a. Josh Pryor, "Krazy Aunt" Karla8, "Uncle" Larry Pearson, Brufus P Owsley, Barry "FNG" Bennett, The "Shock-Doctor", Tripp Rogers, Geoff Scott, Kris "Beavis" Seibers, Ken "O'Doule" Richards, Kevin Hagen, Sean Knight, Stephanie Marr, Roxxy Davis, Greg Mills, Angel "Dangerchick", Steve Hawk, Larry Snider, and "Jumpy" the Rock-Dog and Scotty "Buns of" Steele.

KHTQ has been nominated for a RadioContraband Rock Radio award for "Medium Market Radio Station of the Year" in 2011 and 2012.

KHTQ was inducted into the Rock Radio Hall of Fame in 2014.

See also
List of radio stations in Idaho
List of radio stations in Washington

References

External links
KHTQ station website

Morgan Murphy Media stations
HTQ
Active rock radio stations in the United States
Radio stations established in 1991
1991 establishments in Idaho